Jägersro villastad is a neighbourhood of Malmö, situated in the Borough of Husie, Malmö Municipality, Skåne County, Sweden. It contains the Malmö Mosque, which opened in 1984.

References

Neighbourhoods of Malmö